Pyotr Gornushko (born 12 July 1953) is a Russian equestrian. He competed in two events at the 1976 Summer Olympics.

References

1953 births
Living people
Russian male equestrians
Soviet male equestrians
Olympic equestrians of the Soviet Union
Equestrians at the 1976 Summer Olympics
Sportspeople from Rostov Oblast